Cannabis in Ireland is illegal for recreational purposes. Use for medical purposes requires case-by-case approval by the Minister for Health. A bill to legalise medical uses of cannabis passed second reading in Dáil Éireann (lower house) in December 2016.

History
In the Irish Free State, cannabis and cannabis resin were first prohibited by the Dangerous Drugs Act 1934, which came into force on 1 April 1937. The 1934 act replaced the Dangerous Drugs Act 1920 (a UK act passed before the Free State's creation) and fulfilled the state's obligations under the 1925 revision of the International Opium Convention, which had added Indian hemp to the list of controlled substances, and which was ratified by the Free State in 1931.

Cannabis use increased from the late 1960s. In 1968 the government set up a Working Party on Drug Abuse, whose 1971 report recommended keeping "the legal and medical status of cannabis" under review, and that possession of "a small amount of cannabis" for personal use should not be punished by imprisonment. The recommendation to place cannabis in a separate legal category from other narcotics was included in the Misuse of Drugs Act 1977, which replaced the 1934 act, and remains in force.

Enforcement

The gardaí (Irish police) have a level of discretion when dealing with recreational cannabis users. To procure a conviction any cannabis seized has to be sent for analysis to the Garda Forensic Science Laboratory. This, along with the time needed to process the arrest, means that individual gardaí may decide not to arrest for small amounts, but the drug will be seized and the name of the individual will be taken. Possession of cannabis is an arrestable offense and in 2003, 53 per cent of all drug seizures and 70 per cent of all drug-related prosecutions were for cannabis. Trafficking or possession with intent to supply are serious offenses under Irish law, punishable by fines of up to €2500 and/or a prison sentence up to a year in length.

75% of drug cases before the criminal courts are for simple possession. This accounted for 11,486 of the convictions in 2016.

On being brought to court, the penalties for possession are outlined as follows: 
First offence: On summary conviction, to a fine not exceeding €381, or on conviction on indictment, to a fine not exceeding €635. 
Second offence: On summary conviction, to a fine not exceeding €508, or on conviction on indictment, to a fine not exceeding €1,269. 
Third or subsequent offence: On summary conviction, to a fine not exceeding €1,269 or, at the discretion of the court, to imprisonment for a term not exceeding twelve months, or to both the fine and the imprisonment, or on conviction on indictment, to a fine of such amount as the court considers appropriate or, at the discretion of the court, to imprisonment for a term not exceeding three years, or to both the fine and the imprisonment. There is no law against possession or sale of cannabis seeds.

Medical use
The 1998 regulations under the Misuse of Drugs Act 1977 (as amended) listed cannabis, cannabis resin, cannabinol and its derivatives as schedule 1 drugs. For such drugs, manufacture, production, preparation, sale, supply, distribution and possession is unlawful for any purpose, except under licence from the Minister for Health. Licences were granted to GW Pharmaceuticals in 2002 and 2003 to allow medical trials of the cannabis extract nabiximols (Sativex) in a county Cork hospice and Waterford Regional Hospital. In 2014, the 1998 regulations were amended to allow nabiximols to be prescribed by excepting it from schedule 1. The first licence for medical use of cannabis oil was issued in December 2016 to allow Tristan Forde, a two-year-old boy with Dravet syndrome, to continue treatment begun in Colorado. This was issued by the minister after an application by the boy's physician.

Reform

2010–2019
A community of anonymous cannabis users who reside in Ireland was created under the name Crainn in 2010 as a subreddit on the platform Reddit. In September 2021 it set up a board of directors to "get organised and to help communicate to politicians what we want" and has expanded to other online platforms, such as having a server on Discord which was established in 2017. The organisation has three core pillars: normalisation, education and community. As of January 2022 it had 28,000 members in its subreddit, r/Crainn. By February 2023, this had risen to over 36,000. The organisation has taken part in a number of demonstrations, debates and educational campaigns.

Luke 'Ming' Flanagan, a longstanding pro-cannabis campaigner, was elected to the 31st Dáil in the 2011 general election as an independent Teachta Dála for Roscommon–South Leitrim. On 6 November 2013, he proposed a motion "That Dáil Éireann calls on the Government to introduce legislation to regulate the cultivation, sale and possession of cannabis and cannabis products in Ireland", which was defeated by 111 votes to 8. On 20 November 2013, he introduced a private member's bill, the Cannabis Regulation Bill 2013, which never got a second reading.
 
In November 2015, Aodhán Ó Ríordáin, then Minister of State responsible for the National Drugs Strategy, said he favoured decriminalising cannabis for personal use, and in 2017 called for the legalisation of cannabis to "cut the knees from under drug gangs". Ó Ríordáin lost his Dáil seat at the 2016 election but was reelected in 2020.

In December 2016, a private member's bill was introduced by Gino Kenny of People Before Profit to make cannabis available in Ireland for medicinal use. It passed second stage without a vote. The bill progressed to the amendments stage on 9 November 2017.

In a 2017 interview with Hot Press magazine, Fianna Fáil TD Stephen Donnelly spoke about smoking cannabis. After being announced as a minister in the 2020 cabinet, Donnelly reportedly stood by his 2017 comments, and noted an openness to the liberalisation of some drug laws, stating that if "you're doing something that's not harming anybody else, it's hard to see a legitimate role for the State in prosecuting you for it". A 2020 news article described Donnelly as "broadly supportive" of supervised injection centres and open to making cannabis legal.

In June 2018, after a bill was passed to legalise cannabis in Canada, Taoiseach Leo Varadkar stated that the decriminalisation of cannabis was 'under consideration', with an expert group considering the examining the systems in jurisdictions in which cannabis has been decriminalised for recreational use.

The leader of Ireland's Labour Party, Ivana Bacik, has spoken in favour of legalising cannabis.

2020–present
In a 2020 interview, Green Party health spokesperson, Ossian Smyth said that he raised the proposition of legalising drugs during government negotiations, but added: “Fine Gael and Fianna Fáil said no.”

A poll carried out from 6 to 12 May 2021 by Red C on behalf of TheJournal.ie suggested that 39% of Irish people believe that cannabis should be legalised for both medicinal and recreational use. The number in favour of legalised medicinal and recreational use increased to 56% for those polled aged 18–34 and dropped to 21% for those aged over 55. In regards to the legalisation of medical use of cannabis, 93% of people surveyed were in favour. The polling is based on a survey of over 1,000 adults (aged 18+) taken across the Republic of Ireland and weighted to be an accurate profile of the population.People Before Profit (PBP) supports the legalisation of cannabis for medical and general use. It states that it wants to "legislate for the use of medicinal cannabis for pain management of chronic conditions" and medical cannabis be "researched and made available as an evidence-based option for health care providers and patients". It also states that it wants the "non-commercialised legalisation of cannabis to be regulated by a new state body and dispensed via designated stores". In November 2022, Gino Kenny introduced a bill to legalise personal usage of cannabis, and possession of up to seven grams of cannabis.

In April 2022, cannabis activists took part in a number of campaigns across Dublin City. The organisation known as Crainn held a 'first-of-its-kind' information day in which campaigners wore hi-vis jackets and educated the public on cannabis. Other activist groups such as the Major Group For Cannabis Reform (MGCR) held rallies and marches through the streets, supported by Gino Kenny TD.

Patients for Safe Access (PFSA) will host a national conference on medical cannabis at the Sugar Club in Dublin in June of 2022 with '[T]he goals of creating a patient-led national policy agenda and empowering grassroots advocacy'. The conference will include panelists such as Alicia Maher, Martin O’Brien, members of Crainn, The Major Group for Cannabis Reform, The Cannabis Activist Alliance, Martin Condon and others.

In early December 2022, an Irish legislative body, made up of Irish politicians, known as the 'Joint Committee on Justice' published a report titled " An Examination of the present approach to sanctions for possession of certain amounts of drugs for personal use" that recommended that the government decriminalise drugs such as cannabis, and consider legalising them. The report itself was influenced by advocacy groups and experts such as Patients for Safe Access, Crainn, Dr. Garret McGovern, Dr. Bobby Smyth and Dr. Nuno Capaz.

In 2022 and 2023, Ireland was hit with a wave of synthetic cannabis hospitalisations. In light of this, activist group Crainn spoke to the press and said that this was due to "the lack of regulation around cannabis" and that "it is only a matter of time before we see a synthetic cannabis related death in Ireland".

In February 2023, Government Minister Hildegarde Naughton told the media that she had smoked cannabis in her 20s, and that it "wasn't for her".

Citizens' Assembly on drug use 
In February of 2023, the Irish government established a Citizens' Assembly to look at issues relating to drugs use in April of 2023. A small cross-party group of 'like-minded' TDs and Senators had worked together to push the issue forward, these include: Holly Cairns (Social Democrats), Aodhan O'Riordain (Labour), Paul McAuliffe (Fianna Fáil), Neasa Hourigan (Green Party), Gino Kenny (People Before Profit), Lynn Ruane (Independent), Eileen Flynn (Independent). Sinn Féin are not members of this group. Some members of the group push for the decriminalisation and legalisation of cannabis.

References

External links 

 Cannabis Activists Alliance
 Patients for Safe Access
 Crainn

Archived websites
 Legalise Cannabis Ireland (page as of being archived on 27 February 2022)
 NORML Ireland (page as of being archived on 29 January 2022)